The American College of Military Public Health (ACMPH) is a professional association of public health scientists and clinicians who promote health among Service members and their families.  It was founded in 2016

Focus areas include traumatic brain injury (TBI), posttraumatic stress disorder (PTSD), and infectious disease control This is achieved primarily through information exchange among members.

References

External links 

Medical associations based in the United States
Medical and health organizations based in North Carolina